Breach in the Silence is a 2012 Venezuelan drama film directed by Luis Rodríguez and Andrés Rodríguez. The film was selected as the Venezuelan entry for the Best Foreign Language Film at the 86th Academy Awards, but it was not nominated.

Plot
Ana (Di Quattro) is a deaf-and-dumb girl from an impoverished family. She works in a sewing factory with her mother, Julia (Cuervos), who is enamored with the drunk and abusive Antonio (León) and ignores her three children. After the youngest, Manuel (Pimentel), witnesses Antonio rape Julia, Ana debates taking revenge on the man who has ruined her family.

The Hollywood Reporter writes that "unusually for a Venezuelan movie, there is little direct social comment, and only the most oblique criticism of the wider conditions that have made this family so desperately screwed-up".

Cast
 Vanessa Di Quattro
 Juliana Cuervos
 Rubén León
 Carmily Artígas
 Jonathan Pimentel

Production
The film directors, twins Luis and Andrés Rodríguez, first worked in social work with children and then began making documentaries to show the conditions of many marginalized Venezuelans. After Villa del Cine announced funding for low-budget fiction films in 2011, the brothers applied and were able to tell a similar story as a drama with Breach in the Silence.

The research and writing of the film is said to have taken six months and involved the Venezuelan Association of the Deaf. The film was in pre-production for two months, and filming only took six weeks.

Awards

See also
 List of submissions to the 86th Academy Awards for Best Foreign Language Film
 List of Venezuelan submissions for the Academy Award for Best Foreign Language Film

References

External links

2012 films
2012 drama films
2010s Spanish-language films
Venezuelan drama films